Louppy-le-Château is a commune in the Meuse department in Grand Est in north-eastern France.

Geography
The village lies in the middle of the commune, on the left bank of The Chée, which flows northwestward through the middle of the commune.

See also
Communes of the Meuse department

References

Louppylechateau